Tornado Alicia Black (born May 12, 1998) is an American former tennis player.

She was taught by Rick Macci, a former tennis player. Macci taught many people including Serena and Venus Williams.

Black won two singles titles on the ITF Circuit in her career. On February 2, 2015, she reached her best singles ranking of world No. 404. On September 14, 2015, she peaked at No. 348 in the doubles rankings.

She was runner-up at the 2013 Junior US Open, losing to Ana Konjuh in three sets.

Black made her WTA Tour main-draw debut at the 2014 Abierto Mexicano Telcel. Having been awarded a wildcard, she played Serbian sixth seed Bojana Jovanovski in the first round, losing in straight sets.

Tornado and her younger sister Hurricane Tyra had at one point been referred to as "the next Williams sisters".

In 2017, she was sidelined by a hip injury. Black used GoFundMe to get the $40,000 needed for the hip surgery. Her last match on the circuit so far took place in March 2017.

ITF finals

Singles: 3 (2 titles, 1 runner-up)

Doubles: 1 (runner-up)

Junior Grand Slam tournament finals

Singles

References

External links

 
 
 

1998 births
Living people
Sportspeople from Boca Raton, Florida
American female tennis players
African-American female tennis players
Tennis people from Florida
21st-century African-American sportspeople
21st-century African-American women